Patricia Oren Kearney Cadigan (born September 10, 1953) is a British-American science fiction author, whose work is most often identified with the cyberpunk movement. Her novels and short stories often explore the relationship between the human mind and technology. Her debut novel, Mindplayers, was nominated for the Philip K. Dick Award in 1988.

Early years
Cadigan was born in Schenectady, New York, and grew up in Fitchburg, Massachusetts. 

In the 1960s Cadigan and a childhood friend "invented a whole secret life in which we were twins from the planet Venus", she told National Public Radio. The Beatles "came to us for advice about their songs and how to deal with fame and other important matters," Cadigan says. "On occasion, they would ask us to use our highly developed shape-shifting ability to become them, and finish recording sessions and concert tours when they were too tired to go on themselves." The Venusian twins had other superpowers, that they would sometimes use to help out Superman, Wonder Woman and other heroes, she said.

Cadigan was educated in theater at the University of Massachusetts Amherst and studied science fiction and science fiction writing at the University of Kansas (KU) under science fiction author and editor James Gunn.

Cadigan met her first husband, Rufus Cadigan, while in college; they divorced shortly after she graduated from KU in 1975. That same year, Cadigan joined the convention committee for MidAmeriCon, the 34th World Science Fiction Convention being held in Kansas City, Missouri, over the 1976 Labor Day weekend; she served on the committee as the convention's guest liaison to writer guest of honor Robert A. Heinlein, as well as helped to develop programming for the convention. At the same time, she also worked for fantasy writer Tom Reamy at his Nickelodeon Graphics Arts Service studio, where she daily typset various jobs. She also prepared the type galleys for MidAmeriCon's various publications, including the convention's hardcover program book. Following Reamy's death on 4 November, 1977, Cadigan went to work as a writer for Kansas City, MO's Hallmark Cards company. In the late 1970s and early 1980s, she also edited the small press fantasy and science fiction magazines Chacal and later Shayol with her second husband, Arnie Fenner.

Cadigan emigrated to London in 1996, where she is married to her third husband, Christopher Fowler (not to be confused with the author of the same name). She became a UK citizen in late 2014.

Writing career
Cadigan sold her first professional science fiction story in 1980. Her success as an author encouraged her to become a full-time writer in 1987.

Cadigan's first novel, Mindplayers, introduces what becomes the common theme to all her works: her stories blur the line between reality and perception by making the human mind a real, explorable place. Her second novel, Synners, expands upon the same theme; both feature a future where direct access to the mind via technology is possible. While her stories include many of the gritty, unvarnished characteristics of the cyberpunk genre, she further specializes in this exploration of the speculative relationship between technology and the perceptions of the human mind.

Cadigan has won a number of awards, including the 2013 Hugo Award for "The Girl-Thing Who Went Out for Sushi" in the Best Novelette category, and the Arthur C. Clarke Award in 1992 and 1995 for her novels Synners and Fools.

Robert A. Heinlein dedicated his 1982 novel Friday in part to Cadigan following her being the guest liaison to him at the 34th Worldcon in Kansas City.

Health
In 2013, Cadigan announced that she had been diagnosed with cancer. She underwent surgery after an early diagnosis, suffered a relapse some years after, and recovered after extensive chemotherapy.

Bibliography
From the Internet Speculative Fiction Database.

Series

Deadpan Allie
Mindplayers, (Bantam Spectra Aug. 1987)/(Gollancz Feb. 1988); revised and expanded from the following linked stories:
"The Pathosfinder", (nv) The Berkley Showcase: New Writings in Science Fiction & Fantasy, ed. John Silbersack & Victoria Schochet, Berkley July 1981
"Nearly Departed", (ss) Asimov's June 1983; read online
"Variation on a Man", (ss) Omni Jan. 1984
"Lunatic Bridge", (nv) The Fifth Omni Book of Science Fiction, ed. Ellen Datlow, Zebra Books April 1987
"Dirty Work", (nv) Blood Is Not Enough, ed. Ellen Datlow, Morrow 1989
"A Lie for a Lie", (nv) Lethal Kisses, ed. Ellen Datlow, Millennium Dec. 1996 {aka Wild Justice}

Dore Konstantin (TechnoCrime, Artificial Reality Division)
Tea from an Empty Cup, (Tor Oct. 1998); loosely based on the following linked novellas:
"Death in the Promised Land", (na) Omni Online March 1995 / Asimov’s Nov. 1995
"Tea from an Empty Cup", (na) Omni Online Oct. 1995 / Black Mist and Other Japanese Futures, ed. Orson Scott Card & Keith Ferrell, DAW Dec. 1997
Dervish is Digital, (Macmillan UK Oct. 2000) / (Tor July 2001)

The Web
The Web: Avatar, (Dolphin April 1999); novella

Other novels
Synners, (Bantam Spectra Feb. 1991) / (HarperCollins UK/Grafton Oct. 1991)
Fools, (Bantam Spectra Nov. 1992) / (HarperCollins UK March 1994)

Chapbooks
My Brother's Keeper, (Pulphouse July 1992); novelette, reprinted from Asimov's Jan. 1988
Chalk, (This is Horror Nov. 2013); novelette

Collections
Patterns, (Ursus Sep. 1989)
Introduction, Bruce Sterling (in)
"Patterns", (ss) Omni Aug. 1987
"Eenie, Meenie, Ipsateenie", (ss) Shadows #6, ed. Charles L. Grant, Doubleday 1983
"Vengeance Is Yours", (ss) Omni May 1983
"The Day the Martels Got the Cable", (ss) F&SF Dec. 1982
"Roadside Rescue", (ss) Omni July 1985
"Rock On", (ss) Light Years and Dark, ed. Michael Bishop, Berkley 1984
"Heal", (vi) Omni April 1988
"Another One Hits the Road", (nv) F&SF Jan. 1984
"My Brother's Keeper", (nv) Asimov's Jan. 1988
"Pretty Boy Crossover", (ss) Asimov's Jan. 1986
"Two", (nv) F&SF Jan. 1988
"Angel", (ss) Asimov's May 1987; read online
"It Was the Heat", (ss) Tropical Chills, ed. Tim Sullivan, Avon 1988
"The Power and the Passion", (ss)
Home By the Sea, (WSFA Press May 1992)
Introduction, Mike Resnick (in)
"Dirty Work", (nv) Blood Is Not Enough, ed. Ellen Datlow, Morrow 1989
"50 Ways to Improve Your Orgasm", (ss) Asimov's April 1992
"Dispatches from the Revolution", (nv) Asimov's July 1991; read online (collected in Mike Resnick's alternate history anthology Alternate Presidents)
"Home by the Sea", (nv) A Whisper of Blood, ed. Ellen Datlow, Morrow 1991; Read online
A Cadigan Bibliography, (bi)
Dirty Work, (Mark V. Ziesing Sep. 1993)
Introduction, Storm Constantine (in)
"Dirty Work", (nv) Blood Is Not Enough, ed. Ellen Datlow, Morrow 1989
"Second Comings—Reasonable Rates", (ss) F&SF Feb. 1981
"The Sorceress in Spite of Herself", (ss) Asimov's  Dec. 1982
"50 Ways to Improve Your Orgasm", (ss) Asimov's April 1992
"Mother's Milt", (ss) OMNI Best Science Fiction Two, ed. Ellen Datlow, OMNI Books 1992
"True Faces", (nv) F&SF April 1992
"New Life for Old", (ss) Aladdin: Master of the Lamp, ed. Mike Resnick & Martin H. Greenberg, DAW 1992
"The Coming of the Doll", (ss) F&SF June 1981
"The Pond", (ss) Fears, ed. Charles L. Grant, Berkley 1983
"The Boys in the Rain", (ss) Twilight Zone June 1987
"In the Dark", (ss) When the Music's Over, ed. Lewis Shiner, Bantam Spectra 1991
"Johnny Come Home", (ss) Omni June 1991
"Naming Names", (nv) Narrow Houses, ed. Peter Crowther, Little Brown UK 1992
"A Deal with God", (nv) Grails: Quests, Visitations and Other Occurrences, ed. Richard Gilliam, Martin H. Greenberg & Edward E. Kramer, Unnameable Press 1992
"Dispatches from the Revolution", (nv) Asimov's July 1991; read online
"No Prisoners", (nv) Alternate Kennedys, ed. Mike Resnick, Tor 1992
"Home by the Sea", (nv) A Whisper of Blood, ed. Ellen Datlow, Morrow 1991; Read online
"Lost Girls", (ss)

Anthologies
 Letters from Home, (Women's Press Aug. 1991)
 The Ultimate Cyberpunk, (ibooks Sep. 2002)

Media novelizations/companion novels
 Lost in Space: Promised Land (HarperEntertainment April 1999/Thorndike Press July 1999; original novel/sequel to the movie Lost in Space)
 Upgrade & Sensuous Cindy (Black Flame April 2004; novelization of two episodes from The Twilight Zone)
 Cellular (Black Flame Aug. 2004; novelization of the movie Cellular)
 Jason X (Black Flame Feb. 2005; novelization of the movie Jason X)
 Jason X: The Experiment (Black Flame February 2005; original novel/sequel to the movie Jason X)
 Gemini Man (Titan Books, 2018; novelization of the movie Gemini Man, credited as "Titan Books")
 Alita: Battle Angel—Iron City (Titan Books, November 2018; original novel/prequel to the movie Alita: Battle Angel)
 Alita: Battle Angel—The Official Movie Novelization (Titan Books, February 2019; novelization of the movie Alita: Battle Angel)
 Alien 3: The Unproduced Screenplay (Titan Books, August 2021; novelization of the screenplay by William Gibson)
 Ultraman: The Official Novelization (Titan Books, March 2023; novelization of the series Ultraman).

Media tie-in non-fiction
 The Making of Lost in Space (HarperPrism, May 1998; book on the making of the movie Lost in Space)
 Resurrecting the Mummy: The Making of the Movie (Ebury Press June 1999; book on the making of the movie The Mummy)

References

External links

 
 Ceci N'est Pas Une Blog—Pat Cadigan on LiveJournal
 Story behind Chalk by Pat Cadigan—Online Essay at Upcoming4.me

 Interviews
 1993 interview with Cadigan at The Hardcore
 2000 interview with Cadigan at SF Site
 2006 interview with Cadigan at SF Site
 2019 Interview with Cadigan" at Cyberpunks.com
 "Step Outside: An Interview with Pat Cadigan" at SFsite.com
 2009 interview with Cadigan at The Hathor Legacy
 2010 video interview with Cadigan at Salon Futura
 Driving through a Cloud with Pat Cadigan (interview) at Clarkesworld Magazine, January 2014

1953 births
20th-century American novelists
20th-century American short story writers
20th-century American women writers
21st-century American novelists
21st-century American short story writers
21st-century American women writers
21st-century British novelists
American science fiction writers
American speculative fiction editors
American women novelists
American women short story writers
British science fiction writers
British short story writers
British speculative fiction editors
British women short story writers
Cyberpunk writers
Hugo Award-winning writers
Living people
Novelists from New York (state)
Postmodern writers
Women science fiction and fantasy writers
World Fantasy Award-winning writers
Writers from Schenectady, New York